Kopanishche is a rural locality (a selo) and the administrative center of Kopanishchenskoye Rural Settlement, Liskinsky District, Voronezh Oblast, Russia. The population was 958 as of 2010. There are 10 streets.

Geography 
Kopanishche is located 20 km west of Liski (the district's administrative centre) by road. Podlesny is the nearest rural locality.

References 

Rural localities in Liskinsky District